Dietmar Millonig (born 1 June 1955) is a retired Austrian long-distance runner. He won a gold medal at the 1986 European Indoor Championships. In addition, he represented his country at the 1980 Summer Olympics as well as one outdoor and one indoor World Championships.

He also won 40 Austrian titles in various events.

International competitions

Personal bests
Outdoor
1500 metres – 3:38.38 (Schwechat 1982)
One mile – 3:57.7 (Vienna 1979)
3000 metres – 7:43.66 (Lausanne 1980)
5000 metres – 13:15.31 (Zürich 1982)
10,000 metres – 27:42.98 (Oslo 1982)
10 kilometres – 28:43 (Auckland 1983)
Indoor
1500 metres – 3:39.81 (Budapest 1985)
3000 metres – 7:47.5 (Vienna 1979)
5000 metres – 13:33.79 (East Rutherford 1986)

References

All-Athletics profile

1955 births
Living people
Austrian male middle-distance runners
Austrian male long-distance runners
Athletes (track and field) at the 1980 Summer Olympics
Athletes (track and field) at the 1988 Summer Olympics
Olympic athletes of Austria